Hunga gerontogea is a species of plant in the family Chrysobalanaceae. The species is endemic to New Caledonia.

References

gerontogea
Endemic flora of New Caledonia
Vulnerable plants
Taxonomy articles created by Polbot